Franco Tomás Sosa (born 9 September 1995) is an Argentine footballer currently playing as a forward for Anagni.

Career statistics

Notes

References

1995 births
Living people
Argentine footballers
Argentine expatriate footballers
Association football forwards
Primera B Metropolitana players
Serie D players
Defensores de Belgrano footballers
Aldosivi footballers
Club Atlético Fénix players
Argentine expatriate sportspeople in Italy
Expatriate footballers in Italy